Bally Sports Midwest is an American regional sports network owned by Diamond Sports Group, a joint venture between Sinclair Broadcast Group and Entertainment Studios, and operates as an affiliate of Bally Sports. The channel broadcasts regional event coverage of sports teams throughout the Midwestern United States, most prominently, professional sports teams based in St. Louis, Missouri.

Bally Sports Midwest is available on cable providers throughout eastern and central Missouri, Western and Southern Illinois,  Nebraska, and Iowa; it is also available nationwide on satellite via DirecTV.

History

The channel originally launched by TCI and Bill Daniels in November 1989 as Prime Sports Network Midwest (also referred to as Prime Sports Midwest), serving as an affiliate of the Prime Network. The network was originally based in Indianapolis and held rights to 25 home games of the Indiana Pacers. Originally seen mainly within Indiana, the channel began expanding its cable provider coverage westward in 1994. Following Liberty Media's sale of the Prime Network to News Corporation, the channel became a member of the newly formed Fox Sports Net (then a joint venture between Liberty Media and News Corporation) and rebranded as Fox Sports Midwest (FSMW) on November 1, 1996. The channel was then rebranded as Fox Sports Net Midwest in 1999, as part of a collective brand modification of the FSN networks under the "Fox Sports Net" banner; subsequently in 2004, the channel shortened its name to FSN Midwest, through the networks' de-emphasis of the brand.

In the spring of 2006, Fox Sports Midwest obtained the exclusive regional cable television rights to broadcast NBA games involving the Indiana Pacers. This resulted in the channel creating a spin-off regional sports network channel, Fox Sports Indiana, for the primary purpose of airing games from the Pacers and the WNBA's Indiana Fever; Fox Sports Indiana launched on November 1, 2006, at the start of the team's regular season.

In the fall of 2007, Fox Sports Midwest signed an exclusive long-term agreement to broadcast games from the Kansas City Royals (this followed the team's decision to dissolve the Royals Sports Television Network, a regional television syndication service for the team's game broadcasts). On January 24, 2008, the network formally announced that it would spin-off its subfeed for the Kansas City market into a separate channel, Fox Sports Kansas City, to avoid scheduling conflicts with Fox Sports Midwest's St. Louis Cardinals game coverage. The main St. Louis-based feed reverted to the Fox Sports Midwest moniker that same year.

On July 15, 2010, Fox Sports Midwest signed a new television contract with the St. Louis Cardinals, giving the channel exclusive regional broadcast rights to the team's games beginning with the 2011 season, ending the team's local broadcasts in the St. Louis market on NBC affiliate KSDK (channel 5).

On July 30, 2015, Fox Sports Midwest and the St. Louis Cardinals agreed to a long-term television rights agreement. The new agreement began in 2018 and will run 15 seasons through the 2032 season. The deal will guarantee the St. Louis Cardinals more than $1 billion, including a 30% equity stake in the network.

On December 14, 2017, as part of a merger between both companies, The Walt Disney Company announced plans to acquire all 22 regional Fox Sports networks from 21st Century Fox, including Fox Sports Midwest. However, on June 27, 2018, the Justice Department ordered their divestment under antitrust grounds, citing Disney's ownership of ESPN. On May 3, 2019, Sinclair Broadcast Group and Entertainment Studios (through their joint venture, Diamond Holdings) bought Fox Sports Networks from The Walt Disney Company for $10.6 billion. The deal closed on August 22, 2019. On November 17, 2020, Sinclair announced an agreement with casino operator Bally's Corporation to serve as a new naming rights partner for the FSN channels. Sinclair announced the new Bally Sports branding for the channels on January 27, 2021.  On March 31, 2021, coinciding with the 2021 Major League Baseball season, Fox Sports Midwest was rebranded as Bally Sports Midwest, resulting in 18 other Regional Sports Networks renamed Bally Sports in their respective regions.

On March 14, 2023, Diamond Sports filed for Chapter 11 Bankruptcy.

Programming
Bally Sports Midwest holds the exclusive regional cable television rights to Major League Baseball games from the St. Louis Cardinals and NHL games from the St. Louis Blues. As the St. Louis region is claimed by both the NBA's Indiana Pacers and Memphis Grizzlies, select games from Bally Sports Indiana and Bally Sports South are carried, either as repeats, on Bally Sports Midwest Plus, or on the main channel if a Blues or SLU game is not scheduled that night. The channel also broadcasts college athletics, including men's basketball games from the Missouri Valley Conference, St. Louis Billikens and SIUE Cougars, as well as men's and women's basketball games from the Kansas State Wildcats (which are also broadcast on Bally Sports Kansas City).

Regional feeds
Bally Sports Midwest maintains a total of 6 feeds (not including 5 additional feeds for Bally Sports Indiana and Bally Sports Kansas City). In addition to Cardinals and Blues games which are available in all regions except Nebraska, select games produced by neighboring Bally Sports networks are also carried in some areas. The Kansas City Royals (produced by Bally Sports Kansas City) are offered in most regions outside of the Cardinals exclusive market area. Since the entire coverage area lacks an NBA team, games from two of the following teams are offered in each region: Indiana Pacers, Memphis Grizzlies, Minnesota Timberwolves, and Oklahoma City Thunder.

Former programming
Until the creation of the SEC Network in 2014, Fox Sports Midwest also screened a substantial amount of Missouri Tigers programming, including select football games, basketball, and occasional Olympic sports telecasts. It aired weekly Mizzou magazine shows, as well as football and men's basketball coaches' shows. It also filled a similar role for the Nebraska Cornhuskers until they joined the Big Ten Conference (which too has its own TV channel) in 2012, and like for Mizzou it aired university-produced ancillary programming for the Huskers.

Other services

Bally Sports Midwest Extra
Bally Sports Midwest Extra is an overflow feed of Bally Sports Midwest that was launched in October 2011 as Fox Sports Midwest Plus. Bally Sports Kansas City and Bally Sports Indiana also operate their own Bally Sports Extra overflow feeds to resolve scheduling conflicts with Bally Sports Midwest-televised events that are simulcast on the two channels.

St. Louis Cardinals outside of Bally Sports Midwest broadcast area

The St. Louis Cardinals have one of the largest geographic territories for an MLB team, with includes all or part of 10 states and partially overlaps the territories of 9 other teams. As a result, Bally Sports Midwest provides Cardinals games to neighboring Bally Sports networks (in addition to Bally Sports Indiana and Kansas City) in areas where Bally Sports Midwest is not carried. Most games appear on Bally Sports South or Bally Sports Southeast in parts of western Kentucky, western Tennessee, and northern Mississippi, with the remaining games available on an alternate channel. In Arkansas and Oklahoma games are broadcast on Bally Sports Southwest Extra/Bally Sports Oklahoma Extra.

Notable on-air staff

Current

St. Louis Blues
 John Kelly – play-by-play announcer
 Darren Pang – "Inside-the-Glass" color analyst
 Andy Strickland - ice-level reporter
 Jim "The Cat" Hayes - Blues Live studio host
 Scott Warmann - Blues Live studio host
 Bernie Federko – Blues Live studio analyst
 Jamie Rivers - Blues Live studio analyst
 Alexa Datt - Blues Live studio host and reporter

St. Louis Cardinals
 Chip Caray - play-by-play
 Jim Edmonds - color analyst
 Brad Thompson - color analyst
 Jim "The Cat" Hayes - studio host and field reporter
 Scott Warmann - studio host and field reporter
 Alexa Datt - studio host and field reporter
 Rick Horton – studio analyst
 Al Hrabosky – studio analyst
 Rick Ankiel - studio analyst

College sports
 Scott Warmann - Saint Louis Billikens men's basketball play-by-play
 Scott Highmark - Saint Louis Billikens men's basketball color analyst
 Joe Pott - SIU Edwardsville Cougars men's basketball color analyst
 Mitch Holthus - Missouri Valley Conference men's basketball play-by-play
 Rich Zvosec - Missouri Valley Conference men's basketball color analyst

Former
 Joe Buck - St. Louis Cardinals play by play (now with ESPN)
 Quinn Buckner – Indiana Pacers analyst (now with Bally Sports Indiana)
 Clark Kellogg – Indiana Pacers analyst (now with CBS Sports and Bally Sports Indiana)
 Ryan Lefebvre – Royals play-by-play (now with Bally Sports Kansas City)
 Dan McLaughlin – Cardinals baseball and Saint Louis Billikens men's basketball play-by-play announcer
 Frank White – Royals analyst (now with Bally Sports Kansas City)
 Pat Parris - Blues Live Host, Cardinals Live Host, Saint Louis Billikens and SIUE Cougars men's basketball play-by-play (now with KGUN-TV)
 Eric Piatkowski - Nebraska Cornhuskers basketball analyst (now with Big Ten Network)
 Jon Sundvold - Missouri Tigers basketball analyst (now with ESPN/SEC Network)
 Erica Weston - St. Louis Cardinals field reporter and studio host (now with CBS Sports/CBS Los Angeles)

References

External links

 

Television channels and stations established in 1989
1989 establishments in the United States
Companies that filed for Chapter 11 bankruptcy in 2023
Bally Sports
Fox Sports Networks
Kansas State Wildcats basketball
Missouri Tigers basketball
Missouri Tigers football
Missouri Tigers softball
Missouri Tigers baseball
Prime Sports
Television stations in St. Louis